Mangaon railway station is a station on Konkan Railway serving the town of Mangaon in the Raigad district of Maharashtra. It is at a distance of  down from origin. The previous station on the line is Indapur railway station, a halt station, and the succeeding station is Goregaon Road railway station, also a halt station.

The station offers free Wi-Fi.

Trains
Besides several slow passenger trains, Express trains such as Mandovi Express, Konkan Kanya Express, Matsyagandha Express and Dadar Sawantwadi Road Rajya Rani Express have halts at Mangaon.There was a halt for Konkan kanya Express but post pandemic Konkan railway removed the halt of Konkan kanya express

References

Railway stations along Konkan Railway line
Railway stations in Raigad district
Ratnagiri railway division